The Negro is a 2002 Canadian drama film, directed by Robert Morin. An examination of racism, the film centres on a police officer in a small Quebec town who is trying to reconstruct, through the conflicting testimony of witnesses and participants, the events of the night before, when the petty vandalism of a woman's lawn jockey escalated within a few hours to the woman being found dead and the young Black Canadian suspected of committing the vandalism having been viciously beaten in a field.

The film's original title, equivalent in Quebec French to "the nigger", was controversial, with a Black youth group in Montreal demanding that the film's title and promotional poster be changed. Morin, however, defended his choice to use a controversial title, stating that "If it stirs up some controversy, then at least people will be talking about racism."

The film's cast includes Iannicko N'Doua-Légaré, Béatrice Picard, Robin Aubert, Vincent Bilodeau, Emmanuel Bilodeau, Sandrine Bisson, René-Daniel Dubois, Jean-Guy Bouchard and Dorothée Berryman.

Awards
The film was named to the Toronto International Film Festival's year-end Canada's Top Ten list for 2002.

The film received four Genie Award nominations at the 23rd Genie Awards in 2003: Best Original Screenplay (Morin), Best Costume Design (Sophie Lefebvre), Best Editing (George Browne and Lorraine Dufour) and Best Art Direction or Production Design (André-Line Beauparlant).

The film received three Prix Jutra nominations, for Best Direction (Morin), Best Screenplay (Morin) and Best Editing (Dufour). Dufour won the award for Best Editing.

References

External links

2002 films
2002 drama films
Canadian drama films
Films shot in Quebec
Black Canadian films
Films directed by Robert Morin
2000s Canadian films